Kyzyl-Üngkür is a village in Jalal-Abad Region, Kyrgyzstan. It is part of the Bazar-Korgon District. Its population was 500 in 2021. A road runs from the village southwest down the Kyzyl-Ünkür valley  or more to Bazar-Korgon on the main M41 highway near the Uzbek border.  From the valley, a branch road goes northwest to Arslanbob.

References
 

Populated places in Jalal-Abad Region